The Men's individual pursuit event of the 2009 UCI Track Cycling World Championships was held on 26 March 2009.

Results

Qualifying

Finals

Final classification

References

External links
 Full results at tissottiming.com

Men's individual pursuit
UCI Track Cycling World Championships – Men's individual pursuit